Tomsk Railway Residential Building is a building in Zheleznodorozhny District of Novosibirsk, Russia. It is located along Uritsky Street. The building was built in 1935. Architect: Arkady Shiryayev.

Description
The building is located within the historical district of the 1930s.

Gallery

Bibliography

External links
 Tomsk Railway Residential Building. Жилой дом Томской (Западно-Сибирской) железной дороги. Novosibdom.ru.

Zheleznodorozhny City District, Novosibirsk
Buildings and structures in Novosibirsk
Buildings and structures completed in 1935
Cultural heritage monuments of regional significance in Novosibirsk Oblast